Scenes from the Passion of Christ is an oil painting on a panel of Baltic oak, painted c.1470 by German-born Early Netherlandish painter Hans Memling.  The painting shows 23 vignettes of the Life of Christ combined in one narrative composition without a central dominating scene: 19 episodes from the Passion of Christ, the Resurrection, and three later appearances of the risen Christ (to Mary Magdalene, on the road to Emmaus, and at the Sea of Galilee).  The painting was commissioned by Tommaso Portinari, an Italian banker based in Bruges, who is depicted in a donor portrait kneeling and praying in the lower left corner, with his wife, Maria Baroncelli, in a similar attitude in the lower right corner.

The painting is relatively small, 56.7 × 92.2 cm, and is unlikely to have been an altarpiece.  It may have been intended for Portinari's chapel in the church of St Jacob in Bruges.  It was not catalogued in Portinari's belongings when he died in 1501, and is thought to have been moved from Bruges to Florence between 1510 and 1520.  It is first recorded in the collection of Cosimo I in Florence in 1550.  The painting is now in the Galleria Sabauda in Turin.

Description 

The scenes of the Passion start in the distance at the top left with Jesus's entry into Jerusalem on Palm Sunday, passes through the town and out again to the bottom left to the Garden of Gethsemane, through the Passion scenes in the centre of the city (judgment of Pilate, the Flagellation of Jesus, Crowning with Thorns, Ecce Homo), then follows the procession of the cross back out of the city to the bottom right, then up to the top for the crucifixion, and ending in the distance at the top right with the appearances at Emmaus and Galilee.  It includes seven of the traditional 14 Stations of the Cross, but adds several scenes before and after them, and omits 7: Jesus being given his cross, two occasions when Jesus falls carrying the cross, Jesus meeting his mother, Veronica wiping the face of Jesus, Jesus meeting the daughters of Jerusalem, and Jesus being stripped of his garments.

The scenes are distributed in and around an idealized Jerusalem, depicted as a walled medieval city with exotic towers topped by domes.  The high "birds-eye" point of view makes Calvary visible behind the city.  Unusually, for paintings of this period, the lighting across the painting is internal, associated with the rising sun on the far right, and consistent across the painting, with areas to the rear right in the light and areas to the front left in shadow.

The chronology
In order, the scenes are:

Similarities 

Memling used a similar narrative style for his later Advent and Triumph of Christ (also known as Seven Joys of the Virgin) (1480), made for the altar of the Tanners' guild in Our Lady's Church in Bruges but now held by the Alte Pinakothek in Munich.

Sources
 Web Gallery of Art
 Web Gallery of Art
 Northern Renaissance art, Susie Nash, Oxford University Press, 2008 , p. 278-9
  Jesus: A Life in Pictures, Neil Morris, Salariya Publishers, 2004 , p. 5
 Cyclic form and the English mystery plays: a comparative study of the English biblical cycles and their continental and iconographic counterparts; Volume 7 of Ludus : Medieval and early Renaissance theatre and drama, Peter Happé, Rodopi, 2004 , p. 118-124.

Paintings by Hans Memling
1470s paintings
Paintings depicting the Passion of Jesus
Paintings about death
Christian art about death
Paintings in the Galleria Sabauda
Paintings depicting Mary Magdalene